Myreon Lamar Jones Jr. (born March 17, 2000) is an American college basketball player for the Florida Gators of the Southeastern Conference (SEC). He previously played for the Penn State Nittany Lions.

High school career
Jones played basketball for Huffman High School in Birmingham, Alabama. He averaged 21.1 points, 8.1 rebounds and two assists per game as a junior. For his senior season, he transferred to Lincoln Academy in Suwanee, Georgia. Jones competed for the Georgia Stars on the Amateur Athletic Union circuit. He averaged 19 points per game as a senior, leading his team to a 25–9 record. Jones was ranked the 81st best prospect in his class by 247Sports and was considered to be a four-star prospect. He originally committed to playing college basketball for Memphis but decommitted after head coach Tubby Smith was fired. Jones later announced his commitment to Penn State.

College career
On November 7, 2018, Jones scored a freshman season-high 18 points in a 63–62 win over Virginia Tech. As a freshman, he averaged four points per game off the bench. Jones missed close to four weeks of his sophomore season with an undisclosed illness. As a sophomore, he averaged 13.3 points, three assists, 2.7 rebounds and 1.3 steals per game, earning All-Big Ten honorable mention from the media. On February 23, 2021, he scored a junior season-high 29 points in an 86–83 victory against Nebraska. Jones averaged 15.3 points, 2.7 rebounds, two assists and 1.3 steals per game as a junior, and repeated on the All-Big Ten honorable mention. Following the season, he transferred to Florida.

Career statistics

College

|-
| style="text-align:left;"| 2018–19
| style="text-align:left;"| Penn State
| 30 || 0 || 10.8 || .298 || .277 || .774 || 1.0 || .5 || .5 || .0 || 4.0
|-
| style="text-align:left;"| 2019–20
| style="text-align:left;"| Penn State
| 25 || 24 || 28.6 || .444 || .403 || .776 || 2.7 || 3.0 || 1.3 || .2 || 13.3
|-
| style="text-align:left;"| 2020–21
| style="text-align:left;"| Penn State
| 25 || 24 || 30.3 || .394 || .395 || .773 || 2.7 || 2.0 || 1.3 || .1 || 15.3
|- class="sortbottom"
| style="text-align:center;" colspan="2"| Career
| 80 || 48 || 22.5 || .395 || .376 || .774 || 2.1 || 1.8 || 1.0 || .1 || 10.4

Personal life
Jones is the son of Myreon Sr. and Tammi Jones. In May 2020, he co-founded a podcast called "The Midnight Domino Show" with his Penn State teammate, John Harrar.

References

External links
Florida Gators bio
Penn State Nittany Lions bio

2000 births
Living people
American men's basketball players
Basketball players from Birmingham, Alabama
Florida Gators men's basketball players
Penn State Nittany Lions basketball players
Point guards
Shooting guards